Kitwood is a hamlet in the parish of Four Marks, Hampshire, England. It is in the south east of the Parish and has been part of Four Marks since its creation in 1932. Prior to this, it was part of Ropley Parish.

Although the settlement was located at the junction of Kitwood road and Swelling, as is visible in older maps, the settlement now spreads all the way from Swelling hill pond to Kitwood farm near Hawthorn Road.

Etymology
First Mentioned in AD 1403 as kyteswode  meaning the Kite('s) wood from Old English  'cýta'  and  'wudu' . The actual woodland that is referred to stood somewhere near to where Kitwood Plantation is nowadays.

History
The earliest signs of human activity in Kitwood are a number of mesolithic flint implements that have been found in the past few years. It is also suggested that Swelling Lane, leading west toward Ropley from the hamlet, is the remains of a Roman Road.
Saxon origins are, as can be expected, vague. No finds or information relevant to this period are known.

Medieval
More is known about Kitwood in Medieval times with the first records appearing in the early 15th century. The hamlet has evidence of medieval settlement with medieval potsherds found around the area. Kitwood Lane had some significance in these times too. A court roll record from 1413  mentions "kitteswodeweye" and during a hedgerow dating survey, commissioned for the Four Marks Village Design Statement, the hedgerow on either side of Kitwood Lane was dated to "approximately 800 years old". This wealth of records suggests significant activity in the area since the 1400s.

Post Medieval
Long, parallel field boundaries running on a NE-SW alignment are visible north of Kitwood Farm. These are said to have been laid as a result of the enclosures act of which Ropley was the first parish to be enclosed by act of parliament in 1709. The 1839 Ropley Tithe Map preserves some surnames of these early 1700s post enclosure tenants in the field names such as Withers piece and Davis' piece.

References

External links
 Kitwood Postal Information

Villages in Hampshire